The 1908–09 Penn State Nittany Lions basketball team represented Penn State University during the 1908–09 college men's basketball season. The team finished with a final record of 7–6.

Schedule

|-

References

Penn State Nittany Lions basketball seasons
Penn State
Penn State Nittany Lions Basketball Team
Penn State Nit